Arriva Trains Merseyside was a train operating company in England owned by Arriva that operated the Merseyrail Electrics franchise from January 1997 until July 2003, when the Merseyrail railway franchise was transformed into the local Merseyrail concession, owned by the Merseyrail Passenger Transport Executive (Merseytravel).

History
The Merseyrail Electrics franchise was awarded by the Director of Passenger Rail Franchising to MTL with operations commencing on 19 January 1997. MTL retained the Merseyrail Electrics brand.

On 18 February 2000, MTL was purchased by Arriva, and on 27 April 2001, rebranded as Arriva Trains Merseyside.

On 23 April 2003, Serco-Abellio were awarded the Merseyrail Electrics franchise with the services operated by Arriva Trains Merseyside transferring to Merseyrail on 20 July 2003.

Rolling stock
Arriva Trains Merseyside inherited a fleet of Class 507 and Class 508 electric multiple units from Regional Railways. It also inherited a fleet of Class 73 locomotives and Class 936 EMUs for use on infrastructure trains; these were sold in 2002.

Depot
Arriva Trains Merseyside's fleet was maintained at Birkenhead North Depot.

References

Further reading

 
 
 

Arriva Group companies
Defunct train operating companies
Historic transport in Merseyside
Railway companies established in 1997
Railway companies disestablished in 2003
Rail transport in Merseyside
1997 establishments in England
2003 disestablishments in England